Campbell Stewart (born 12 May 1998) is a New Zealand professional track and road cyclist, who currently rides for UCI WorldTeam . He represented his country at the 2018 Commonwealth Games, gaining two silver medals in the scratch race and points race, and the 2020 Summer Olympics, gaining a silver medal in the omnium.

Stewart was born in Palmerston North in 1998, and attended Palmerston North Boys' High School.

At the 2020 Summer Olympics in Tokyo, Stewart competed in the team pursuit event. After fellow rider Aaron Gate crashed in the team pursuit bronze medal race and fractured his collarbone, Stewart took Gate's places in the omnium and madison events.

Major results

Track

2014
 1st  Omnium, Oceania Junior Championships
2015
 UCI World Junior Championships
1st  Omnium
1st  Scratch
 1st  Omnium, National Junior Championships
2016
 UCI World Junior Championships
1st  Omnium
1st  Team pursuit
2nd  Madison (with Tom Sexton)
 UCI World Cup
2nd Scratch, Los Angeles
2nd Omnium, Los Angeles
3rd Madison, Los Angeles (with Tom Sexton)
2017
 Oceania Championships
1st  Madison (with Tom Sexton)
2nd  Team pursuit
2nd  Omnium
 1st  Madison (with Dylan Kennett), National Championships
 UCI World Cup
1st Team pursuit, Milton
1st Team pursuit, Santiago
1st Madison (with Tom Sexton), Santiago
2nd Madison (with Tom Sexton), Milton
2018
 UCI World Cup
1st Team pursuit, Cambridge
1st Madison (with Tom Sexton), Hong Kong
1st Madison (with Aaron Gate), Cambridge
3rd Omnium, Milton
3rd Omnium, Hong Kong
 Commonwealth Games
2nd  Scratch
2nd  Points race
 3rd  Omnium, Oceania Championships
2019
 1st  Omnium, UCI World Championships
 1st  Madison (with Jordan Kerby), National Championships
 UCI World Cup
1st Omnium, Hong Kong
1st Omnium, Cambridge
1st Madison (with Aaron Gate), Cambridge
2nd Team pursuit, Hong Kong
2nd Team pursuit, Brisbane
2nd Madison (with Tom Sexton), Hong Kong
 Oceania Championships
2nd  Madison
2nd  Omnium
2020
 1st  Madison (with Aaron Gate), National Championships
 UCI World Championships
2nd  Madison (with Aaron Gate)
2nd  Team pursuit
2021
 2nd  Omnium, Olympic Games
2022
 1st  Team pursuit, Commonwealth Games

Road
2015
 1st  Road race, National Junior Championships
2016
 1st Stage 4 National Capital Tour
2019
 1st Stage 2 Tour of Southland
2020
 1st Stage 2 New Zealand Cycle Classic
 1st Stage 5 Tour of Southland
2021
 1st Stage 5 New Zealand Cycle Classic
 2nd Overall A Travers les Hauts de France
1st Stages 2 & 3
 7th Omloop van het Houtland
 9th Gravel and Tar Classic

References

External links

1998 births
Commonwealth Games medallists in cycling
Commonwealth Games silver medallists for New Zealand
Cyclists at the 2018 Commonwealth Games
Living people
New Zealand male cyclists
Sportspeople from Palmerston North
New Zealand track cyclists
UCI Track Cycling World Champions (men)
Olympic cyclists of New Zealand
Cyclists at the 2020 Summer Olympics
Olympic silver medalists for New Zealand
Olympic medalists in cycling
Medalists at the 2020 Summer Olympics
People educated at Palmerston North Boys' High School
Cyclists at the 2022 Commonwealth Games
Commonwealth Games competitors for New Zealand
Commonwealth Games gold medallists for New Zealand
20th-century New Zealand people
21st-century New Zealand people
Medallists at the 2018 Commonwealth Games
Medallists at the 2022 Commonwealth Games